Artaxias (also called Artaxes or Artashes) may refer to:

Kings & monarchs of Armenia
 Artaxiad Dynasty (190 BC–12 AD) eponymously named after its founder Artaxias or Artashes
 Artaxias I, reigned 190–159 BC, founder of the Artaxiad Dynasty
 Artaxias II, reigned 34–20 BC
 Artaxias III, reigned 18–35; no relation to the Artaxiad Dynasty
 Artaxias IV, reigned 422–428, last king of the Arsacid Dynasty; no relation to the Artaxiads

Kings of Iberia
 Artaxias I of Iberia (died 78 BC)
 Arshak II of Iberia (died 1), also known as Artaxias II of Iberia

Modern people
 Artashes Avoyan (born 1972), Armenian lawyer
 Artashes Arakelian (1909–1993), economist and member of the Armenian Academy of Sciences 
 Artashes Babalian (1886—1959), Armenian doctor and politician
 Artashes Baghdasaryan (born 1984), Armenian football defender
 Artashes Geghamyan (born 1949), Armenian politician
 Ardashes Harutunian (1873-1915), Armenian poet and translator
 Artashes Kalaydzhan (born 1971), Russian Armenian footballer
 Arthur Meschian, (born 1949), Armenian rock musician, artist, and architect
 Artashes Minasian (born 1967), Armenian chess Grandmaster
 Artashes Shahinyan, founder of the PhysMath School after A. Shaninyan (Yerevan)

Places
 Artashat (ancient city), also known as Artaxata, a city in Armenia
 Hartashen, Syunik, also known as Artashe, a rural community in Armenia

See also
 Ardeshir (disambiguation)
 Artaxerxes (disambiguation)
 Asha